Rhinophis zigzag, or Zigzag Shieldtail, is a species of snake in the Uropeltidae family. It is endemic to Sri Lanka.

References

 http://reptile-database.reptarium.cz/species?genus=Rhinophis&species=zigzag
 http://www.sundaytimes.lk/110522/News/nws_10.html
 https://www.academia.edu/3336826/Rhinophis_goweri_-_new_shieldtail_snake_from_Eastern_Ghats
 https://www.researchgate.net/publication/215565299_Two_new_species_of_Rhinophis_Hemprich_(Serpentes_Uropeltidae)_from_Sri_Lanka

zigzag
Reptiles of Sri Lanka
Reptiles described in 2011